The Hungarian Athletics Championships is an annual outdoor track and field competition, organised by the Hungarian Athletics Association, which serves as the national championship for the sport in Hungary. Winners of events at the competition are declared the Hungarian national champions for that year. The competition was first held in 1896 as a men's only competition and women's events were added in 1932.

100 metres
1960: Erzsébet Bartos
1961: Margit Nemesházi
1962: Erzsébet Bartos
1963: Margit Nemesházi
1964: Margit Nemesházi
1965: Margit Nemesházi
1966: Annamária Tóth
1967: Margit Nemesházi
1968: Györgyi Balogh
1969: Judit Szabó
1970: Judit Szabó
1971: Györgyi Balogh
1972: Györgyi Balogh
1973: Judit Szabó
1974: Ildikó Szabó
1975: Ildikó Szabó
1976: Irma Könye
1977: Ildikó Erdélyi
1978: Irén Orosz-Árva
1979: Irén Orosz-Árva
1980: Irén Orosz-Árva
1981: Irén Orosz-Árva
1982: Erzsébet Juhász
1983: Erzsébet Ecseki-Juhász
1984: Xénia Siska
1985: Irma Könye
1986: Erzsébet Ecseki-Juhász
1987: Erzsébet Ecseki-Juhász
1988: Irma Könye
1989: Ágnes Kozáry
1990: Edit Molnár
1991: Edit Molnár
1992: Edit Molnár
1993: Éva Barati
1994: Éva Barati
1995: Éva Barati
1996: Éva Barati
1997: Éva Barati
1998: Éva Barati
1999: Tünde Vaszi
2000: Enikõ Szabó
2001: Krisztina Lõrincz
2002: Enikõ Szabó
2003: Enikõ Szabó
2004: Enikõ Szabó
2005: Enikõ Szabó
2006: Edit Vári

200 metres
1960: Antónia Munkácsi
1961: Erzsébet Bartos
1962: Erzsébet Bartos
1963: Erzsébet Bartos
1964: Margit Nemesházi
1965: Annamária Tóth
1966: Erzsébet Bartos
1967: Annamária Tóth
1968: Györgyi Balogh
1969: Györgyi Balogh
1970: Györgyi Balogh
1971: Györgyi Balogh
1972: Györgyi Balogh
1973: Judit Szabó
1974: Ildikó Szabó
1975: Irma Könye
1976: Irma Könye
1977: Ildikó Erdélyi
1978: Irén Orosz-Árva
1979: Irén Orosz-Árva
1980: Irén Orosz-Árva
1981: Irén Orosz-Árva
1982: Judit Forgács
1983: Judit Forgács
1984: Ibolya Petrika
1985: Irma Könye
1986: Judit Forgács
1987: Judit Acs
1988: Irma Könye
1989: Ágnes Kozáry
1990: Edit Molnár
1991: Edit Molnár
1992: Éva Barati
1993: Éva Barati
1994: Éva Barati
1995: Éva Barati
1996: Éva Barati
1997: Éva Barati
1998: Petronella Árva
1999: Krisztina Lõrincz
2000: Enikõ Szabó
2001: Barbara Petráhn
2002: Enikõ Szabó
2003: Enikõ Szabó
2004: Enikõ Szabó
2005: Nikolett Listár
2006: Nikolett Listár

400 metres
1960: Olga Kazi
1961: Ida Németh
1962: Antónia Munkácsi
1963: Olga Kazi
1964: Antónia Munkácsi
1965: Zsuzsa Szabó
1966: Zsuzsa Szabó
1967: Antónia Munkácsi
1968: Magdolna Lázár
1969: Magdolna Kulcsár
1970: Rozália Séfer
1971: Györgyi Balogh
1972: Györgyi Balogh
1973: Judit Szabó
1974: Irén Orosz-Árva
1975: Éva Tóth
1976: Éva Tóth
1977: Judit Forgács
1978: Ilona Pál
1979: Ilona Pál
1980: Ilona Pál
1981: Ibolya Petrika
1982: Judit Forgács
1983: Judit Forgács
1984: Ibolya Petrika
1985: Ibolya Petrika
1986: Judit Forgács
1987: Erzsébet Szabó
1988: Erzsébet Szabó
1989: Judit Forgács
1990: Judit Forgács
1991: Judit Forgács
1992: Judit Forgács
1993: Mónika Mádai
1994: Mónika Mádai
1995: Judit Szekeres
1996: Barbara Petráhn
1997: Judit Szekeres
1998: Judit Szekeres
1999: Judit Szekeres
2000: Barbara Petráhn
2001: Alice Kun
2002: Barbara Petráhn
2003: Barbara Petráhn
2004: Barbara Petráhn
2005: Barbara Petráhn
2006: Barbara Petráhn

800 metres
1960: Olga Kazi
1961: Olga Kazi
1962: Olga Kazi
1963: Olga Kazi
1964: Zsuzsa Szabó
1965: Olga Kazi
1966: Zsuzsa Szabó
1967: Sára Szenteleki-Ligetkuti
1968: Sára Szenteleki-Ligetkuti
1969: Mária Budavári
1970: Magdolna Kulcsár
1971: Magdolna Kulcsár
1972: Magdolna Kulcsár
1973: Márta Velekei
1974: Irén Lipcsei
1975: Magdolna Lázár
1976: Irén Lipcsei
1977: Irén Lipcsei
1978: Irén Lipcsei
1979: Éva Váczi
1980: Éva Koleszár
1981: Katalin Véninger
1982: Éva Mohácsi
1983: Katalin Szalai
1984: Katalin Szalai
1985: Elvira Biacsics
1986: Elvira Biacsics
1987: Erzsébet Szabó
1988: Erzsébet Todorán
1989: Erzsébet Szabó
1990: Erzsébet Szabó
1991: Erzsébet Szabó
1992: Viktória Barta
1993: Szilvia Csoszánszky
1994: Szilvia Csoszánszky
1995: Judit Varga
1996: Judit Varga
1997: Judit Varga
1998: Judit Varga
1999: Judit Varga
2000: Judit Varga
2001: Judit Varga
2002: Judit Varga
2003: Judit Varga
2004: Judit Varga
2005: Kitty Cziráki
2006: Boglárka Bozzay

1500 metres
1968: Olga Kazi
1969: Zsuzsa Völgyi
1970: Sára Szenteleki-Ligetkuti
1971: Sára Szenteleki-Ligetkuti
1972: Sára Szenteleki-Ligetkuti
1973: Márta Velekei
1974: Zsuzsa Völgyi
1975: Magdolna Lázár
1976: Magdolna Lázár
1977: Magdolna Lázár
1978: Magdolna Lázár
1979: Irén Lipcsei
1980: Éva Koleszár
1981: Katalin Véninger
1982: Katalin Véninger
1983: Katalin Szalai
1984: Katalin Szalai
1985: Erika Veréb
1986: Katalin Rácz
1987: Katalin Rácz
1988: Katalin Rácz
1989: Katalin Rácz
1990: Katalin Véninger
1991: Katalin Véninger
1992: Éva Dóczi
1993: Éva Dóczi
1994: Anikó Javos
1995: Viktória Barta
1996: Brigitta Tusai
1997: Brigitta Tusai
1998: Brigitta Tusai
1999: Brigitta Tusai
2000: Erika Csomor
2001: Lívia Tóth
2002: Lívia Tóth
2003: Krisztina Papp
2004: Lívia Tóth
2005: Krisztina Papp
2006: Krisztina Papp

3000 metres
1974: Zsuzsa Völgyi
1975: Zsuzsa Völgyi
1976: Borbála Csipán
1977: Zsuzsa Völgyi
1978: Zsuzsa Völgyi
1979: Magdolna Lázár
1980: Magdolna Lázár
1981: Antónia Ladányi
1982: Ilona Jankó
1983: Karolin Szabó
1984: Ilona Jankó
1985: Katalin Szalai
1986: Erika Veréb
1987: Karolin Szabó
1988: Erika Veréb
1989: Zita Ágoston
1990: Zita Ágoston
1991: Katalin Véninger
1992: Katalin Véninger
1993: Éva Dóczi
1994: Éva Dóczi
1995: Anikó Javos

5000 metres
1985: Márta Visnyei
1986: Erika Veréb
1987: Erika Veréb
1988: Erika Veréb
1989: Not held
1990: Not held
1991: Not held
1992: Not held
1993: Not held
1994: Not held
1995: Éva Dóczi
1996: Éva Dóczi
1997: Éva Dóczi
1998: Anikó Kálovics
1999: Katalin Szentgyörgyi
2000: Anikó Kálovics
2001: Simona Staicu
2002: Anikó Kálovics
2003: Anikó Kálovics
2004: Krisztina Papp
2005: Krisztina Papp
2006: Simona Staicu

10,000 metres
1983: Ilona Jankó
1984: Karolin Szabó
1985: Karolin Szabó
1986: Karolin Szabó
1987: Karolin Szabó
1988: Erika Veréb
1989: Zita Ágoston
1990: Heléna Barócsi
1991: Heléna Barócsi
1992: Márta Visnyei
1993: Heléna Barócsi
1994: Éva Dóczi
1995: Éva Dóczi
1996: Kornélia Pásztor
1997: Anikó Kálovics
1998: Anikó Kálovics
1999: Beáta Rakonczai
2000: Beáta Rakonczai
2001: Simona Staicu
2002: Krisztina Papp
2003: Simona Staicu
2004: Anikó Kálovics
2005: Krisztina Papp
2006: Krisztina Papp

Half marathon
The course for the 2001 championship race was short of the half marathon distance.
1992: Márta Visnyei
1993: Heléna Barócsi
1994: Kornélia Pásztor
1995: Heléna Barócsi
1996: Éva Petrik
1997: Judit Földing-Nagy
1998: Judit Földing-Nagy
1999: Judit Földing-Nagy
2000: Erika Csomor
2001: Simona Staicu
2002: Judit Földing-Nagy
2003: Anikó Kálovics
2004: Anikó Kálovics
2005: Eszter Erdélyi

Marathon
1981: Ágnes Öze-Sipka
1982: Karolin Szabó
1983: Ilona Danovszky-Zsilák
1984: Antónia Ladányi
1985: Ágnes Öze-Sipka
1986: Karolin Szabó
1987: Ágota Farkas
1988: Karolin Szabó
1989: Ágnes Öze-Sipka
1990: Enikõ Fehér
1991: Márta Visnyei
1992: Judit Földing-Nagy
1993: Márta Vass
1994: Gizella Molnár
1995: Ágota Farkas
1996: Gizella Molnár
1997: Ágnes Jakab
1998: Judit Földing-Nagy
1999: Erika Csomor
2000: Erika Csomor
2001: Judit Földing-Nagy
2002: Ida Kovács
2003: Judit Földing-Nagy
2004: Simona Staicu
2005: Ida Kovács
2006: Petra Teveli

3000 metres steeplechase
2002: Lívia Tóth
2003: Lívia Tóth
2004: Lívia Tóth
2005: Lívia Tóth
2006: Eszter Erdélyi

80 metres hurdles
1960: Ida Németh
1961: Klára Somogyi
1962: Ida Németh
1963: Vera Rózsavölgyi
1964: Ildikó Jónás
1965: Ildikó Jónás
1966: Annamária Tóth
1967: Annamária Tóth
1968: Györgyi Balogh

100 metres hurdles
1969: Annamária Tóth
1970: Mária Kiss
1971: Mária Kiss
1972: Ilona Bruzsenyák
1973: Ilona Bruzsenyák
1974: Ilona Bruzsenyák
1975: Ildikó Szabó
1976: Ilona Bruzsenyák
1977: Katalin Balogh
1978: Xénia Siska
1979: Margit Papp
1980: Xénia Siska
1981: Xénia Siska
1982: Xénia Siska
1983: Xénia Siska
1984: Xénia Siska
1985: Margit Palombi
1986: Xénia Siska
1987: Margit Palombi
1988: Xénia Siska
1989: Margit Palombi
1990: Andrea Kalamár
1991: Helga Drommer
1992: Helga Drommer
1993: Zita Bálint
1994: Zita Bálint
1995: Zita Bálint
1996: Zita Bálint
1997: Zita Bálint
1998: Zita Bálint
1999: Zita Bálint
2000: Zita Bálint
2001: Edit Vári
2002: Edit Vári
2003: Edit Vári
2004: Edit Vári
2005: Edit Vári
2006: Edit Vári

200 metres hurdles
1969: Mária Kiss

400 metres hurdles
1976: Éva Mohácsi
1977: Éva Mohácsi
1978: Éva Mohácsi
1979: Éva Mohácsi
1980: Éva Palanek
1981: Gertrud Gyovai & Éva Mohácsi
1982: Gertrud Gyovai
1983: Erika Szopori
1984: Erika Szopori
1985: Erika Szopori
1986: Éva Balázs
1987: Erika Szopori
1988: Zsófia Antók
1989: Zsófia Antók
1990: Judit Szekeres
1991: Judit Szekeres
1992: Gyöngyvér Csete
1993: Szilvia Ray
1994: Judit Szekeres
1995: Judit Szekeres
1996: Judit Szekeres
1997: Judit Szekeres
1998: Judit Szekeres
1999: Szilvia Ray
2000: Orsolya Dóczi
2001: Orsolya Dóczi
2002: Judit Vékony
2003: Dóra Horváth
2004: Réka Skoumal
2005: Andrea Pék
2006: Réka Skoumal

High jump
1960: Márta Keresztes
1961: Éva Szilas
1962: Éva Mihályfi
1963: Éva Gelei
1964: Éva Gelei
1965: Éva Tóth
1966: Anna Noszály
1967: Anna Noszály
1968: Magdolna Komka
1969: Magdolna Komka
1970: Magdolna Komka
1971: Erika Rudolf
1972: Magdolna Komka
1973: Andrea Mátay
1974: Andrea Kreisz
1975: Andrea Mátay
1976: Erika Rudolf
1977: Andrea Mátay
1978: Andrea Mátay
1979: Andrea Mátay
1980: Katalin Sterk
1981: Emese Béla
1982: Katalin Sterk
1983: Emese Béla
1984: Olga Juha
1985: Andrea Mátay
1986: Katalin Sterk
1987: Olga Juha
1988: Katalin Sterk
1989: Judit Kovács
1990: Judit Kovács
1991: Judit Kovács
1992: Judit Kovács
1993: Krisztina Solti
1994: Erzsébet Fazekas
1995: Erzsébet Fazekas
1996: Dóra Győrffy
1997: Dóra Győrffy
1998: Dóra Győrffy
1999: Dóra Győrffy
2000: Dóra Győrffy
2001: Dóra Győrffy
2002: Dóra Győrffy
2003: Dóra Győrffy
2004: Bernadett Bódi
2005: Dóra Győrffy
2006: Dóra Győrffy

Pole vault
1995: Zsuzsanna Szabó-Olgyai
1996: Zsuzsanna Szabó-Olgyai
1997: Eszter Szemerédi
1998: Zsuzsanna Szabó-Olgyai
1999: Zsuzsanna Szabó-Olgyai
2000: Zsuzsanna Szabó-Olgyai
2001: Krisztina Molnár
2002: Krisztina Molnár
2003: Zsuzsanna Szabó-Olgyai
2004: Krisztina Molnár
2005: Krisztina Molnár
2006: Krisztina Molnár

Long jump
1960: Vera Rózsavölgyi
1961: Vera Rózsavölgyi
1962: Orsolya Petró
1963: Vera Rózsavölgyi
1964: Eta Kispál
1965: Annamária Tóth
1966: Eta Kispál
1967: Eta Kispál
1968: Eta Kispál
1969: Annamária Tóth
1970: Eta Kispál
1971: Klára Woth
1972: Anikó Ziegner
1973: Margit Papp
1974: Ilona Bruzsenyák
1975: Ildikó Szabó
1976: Ildikó Erdélyi
1977: Ildikó Erdélyi
1978: Mária Pap
1979: Margit Papp
1980: Zsuzsa Vanyek
1981: Klára Novobáczky
1982: Zsuzsa Vanyek
1983: Zsuzsa Vanyek
1984: Klára Novobáczky
1985: Zsuzsa Vanyek
1986: Ildikó Fekete
1987: Zsuzsa Vanyek
1988: Zsuzsa Vanyek
1989: Zsuzsa Vanyek
1990: Zsuzsa Vanyek
1991: Zsuzsa Vanyek
1992: Zsuzsa Vanyek
1993: Rita Ináncsi
1994: Rita Ináncsi
1995: Rita Ináncsi
1996: Tünde Vaszi
1997: Tünde Vaszi
1998: Tünde Vaszi
1999: Tünde Vaszi
2000: Zita Ajkler
2001: Tünde Vaszi
2002: Tünde Vaszi
2003: Tünde Vaszi
2004: Tünde Vaszi
2005: Tünde Vaszi
2006: Tünde Vaszi

Triple jump
1991: Ildikó Fekete
1992: Ildikó Fekete
1993: Ildikó Fekete
1994: Éva Medovárszky
1995: Tünde Vaszi
1996: Zita Bálint
1997: Zita Bálint
1998: Zita Bálint
1999: Zita Bálint
2000: Zita Ajkler
2001: Zita Ajkler
2002: Zita Ajkler
2003: Éva Miklós
2004: Zita Ajkler
2005: Zita Ajkler
2006: Zita Ajkler

Shot put
1960: Jolán Kleiber-Kontsek
1961: Jolán Kleiber-Kontsek
1962: Judit Bognár
1963: Judit Bognár
1964: Judit Bognár
1965: Judit Bognár
1966: Judit Bognár
1967: Judit Bognár
1968: Judit Bognár
1969: Judit Nagy
1970: Judit Bognár
1971: Judit Bognár
1972: Judit Bognár
1973: Judit Bognár
1974: Judit Bognár
1975: Margit Irányi
1976: Margit Irányi
1977: Edit Armuth
1978: Margit Irányi
1979: Edit Armuth
1980: Viktória Horváth
1981: Viktória Horváth
1982: Viktória Horváth
1983: Viktória Horváth
1984: Hajnal Herth
1985: Hajnal Herth
1986: Márta Kripli
1987: Viktória Szélinger
1988: Viktória Szélinger
1989: Viktória Horváth
1990: Viktória Horváth
1991: Viktória Horváth
1992: Mónika Stefanovics
1993: Hajnal Vörös
1994: Hajnal Vörös
1995: Hajnal Vörös
1996: Rita Ináncsi
1997: Éva Kürti
1998: Katalin Divós
1999: Katalin Divós
2000: Katalin Divós
2001: Éva Kürti
2002: Éva Kürti
2003: Éva Kürti
2004: Éva Kürti
2005: Éva Kürti
2006: Anita Márton

Discus throw
1960: Jolán Kleiber-Kontsek
1961: Jolán Kleiber-Kontsek
1962: Jolán Kleiber-Kontsek
1963: Judit Stugner
1964: Jolán Kleiber
1965: Jolán Kleiber
1966: Jolán Kleiber
1967: Jolán Kleiber
1968: Jolán Kleiber
1969: Judit Stugner
1970: Jolán Kleiber
1971: Jolán Kleiber
1972: Jolán Kleiber
1973: Judit Bognár
1974: Zsuzsa Pallay
1975: Róza Czabán
1976: Ágnes Herczegh
1977: Ágnes Herczegh
1978: Ágnes Herczegh
1979: Katalin Tóth
1980: Ágnes Herczegh
1981: Zsuzsa Pallay
1982: Ágnes Herczegh
1983: Márta Kripli
1984: Márta Kripli
1985: Márta Kripli
1986: Márta Kripli
1987: Ágnes Herczeg
1988: Márta Bacskai
1989: Ágnes Herczegh
1990: Ágnes Herczegh
1991: Ágnes Herczegh
1992: Katalin Tóth
1993: Katalin Csöke
1994: Katalin Csöke
1995: Katalin Csöke
1996: Katalin Csöke
1997: Katalin Csöke
1998: Katalin Divós
1999: Katalin Divós
2000: Katalin Divós
2001: Éva Kürti
2002: Éva Kürti
2003: Éva Kürti
2004: Éva Kürti
2005: Katalin Divós
2006: Katalin Máté

Hammer throw
1996: Katalin Divós
1997: Katalin Divós
1998: Katalin Divós
1999: Katalin Divós
2000: Katalin Divós
2001: Barbara Sugár
2002: Julianna Tudja
2003: Katalin Divós
2004: Katalin Divós
2005: Éva Orbán
2006: Éva Orbán

Javelin throw
1960: Márta Antal
1961: Márta Antal
1962: Márta Antal
1963: Zsuzsa Dusnoki
1964: Márta Rudas
1965: Márta Rudas
1966: Márta Rudas
1967: Ágnes Radnai
1968: Angéla Németh
1969: Angéla Németh
1970: Magda Paulányi
1971: Angéla Németh
1972: Magda Paulányi
1973: Mária Kucserka
1974: Mária Vágó
1975: Mária Vágó
1976: Viktória Fekete
1977: Aranka Vágási
1978: Mária Janák
1979: Viktória Fekete
1980: Aranka Vágási
1981: Mária Janák
1982: Mária Janák
1983: Mária Janák
1984: Katalin Hartai
1985: Éva Budavári
1986: Zsuzsa Malovecz
1987: Zsuzsa Malovecz
1988: Katalin Hartai
1989: Zsuzsa Malovecz
1990: Katalin Hartai
1991: Kinga Zsigmond
1992: Kinga Zsigmond
1993: Kinga Zsigmond
1994: Kinga Zsigmond
1995: Kinga Zsigmond
1996: Ágnes Preisinger
1997: Nikolett Szabó
1998: Nikolett Szabó
1999: Nikolett Szabó
2000: Nikolett Szabó
2001: Nikolett Szabó
2002: Xénia Frajka
2003: Nikolett Szabó
2004: Nikolett Szabó
2005: Nikolett Szabó
2006: Xénia Frajka

Pentathlon
1960: Erzsébet Oo
1961: Klára Somogyi
1962: Ida Németh
1963: Vera Rózsavölgyi
1964: Annamária Tóth
1965: Annamária Tóth
1966: Annamária Tóth
1967: Annamária Tóth
1968: Margit Papp
1969: Annamária Tóth
1970: Margit Papp
1971: Ilona Bruzsenyák
1972: Ilona Bruzsenyák
1973: Ilona Bruzsenyák
1974: Ilona Bruzsenyák
1975: Ilona Bruzsenyák
1976: Margit Papp
1977: Margit Papp
1978: Margit Papp
1979: Zsuzsa Czene
1980: Margit Papp

Heptathlon
1981: Zsuzsa Vanyek
1982: Zsuzsa Vanyek
1983: Gabriella Bebesi
1984: Zsuzsa Vanyek
1985: Zsuzsa Vanyek
1986: Margit Palombi
1987: Zsuzsa Vanyek
1988: Margit Palombi
1989: Rita Ináncsi
1990: Zita Bálint
1991: Rita Ináncsi
1992: Rita Ináncsi
1993: Rita Ináncsi
1994: Enikõ Kiss
1995: Vera Ináncsi
1996: Zita Bálint
1997: Zita Bálint
1998: Zita Bálint
1999: Enikõ Kiss
2000: Enikõ Kiss
2001: Zita Ajkler
2002: Réka Skoumal
2003: Katalin Deák
2004: Zita Óvári
2005: Zita Óvári
2006: Zita Ajkler

10 kilometres walk
1984: 
1985: Andrea Alföldi
1986: Rudolfne Hudi
1987: Andrea Alföldi
1988: Anikó Szebenszky
1989: Mária Urbanik
1990: Mária Urbanik
1991: Ibolya Váradi
1992: Andrea Alföldi
1993: Mária Urbanik
1994: Mária Urbanik
1995: Mária Urbanik
1996: Anikó Szebenszky
1997: Anikó Szebenszky
1998: Anikó Szebenszky
1999: Mónika Pesti
2000: Mónika Pesti
2001: Mária Urbanik
2002: Edina Füsti
2003: Ildikó Ilyés
2004: Edina Füsti
2005: Ildikó Ilyés
2006: Ildikó Ilyés

20 kilometres walk
1995: Ildikó Ilyés
1996: Mária Urbanik
1997: Mónika Pesti
1998: Mónika Pesti
1999: Mária Urbanik
2000: Anikó Szebenszky
2001: Mária Urbanik
2002: Edina Füsti
2003: Katalin Varró
2004: Ildikó Ilyés
2005: Ildikó Ilyés
2006: Dóra Nemere

Cross country
1960: Aranka Kazi
1961: Aranka Kazi
1962: Olga Kazi
1963: Mária Tóth
1964: Zsuzsa Szabó
1965: Sára Szenteleki-Ligetkuti
1966: Katalin Nagy
1967: Mária Tóth
1968: Ilona Zsilák
1969: Magdolna Kulcsár
1970: Borbála Csipán
1971: Zsuzsa Völgyi
1972: Borbála Csipán
1973: Zsuzsa Völgyi
1974: Zsuzsa Völgyi
1975: Magdolna Lázár
1976: Magdolna Lázár
1977: Magdolna Lázár
1978: Magdolna Lázár
1979: Janka Horváth
1980: Antónia Ladányi
1981: Antónia Ladányi
1982: Ilona Jankó
1983: Ilona Jankó
1984: Katalin Szalai
1985: Ilona Jankó
1986: Erika Veréb
1987: Erika Veréb
1988: Heléna Barócsi
1989: Márta Visnyei
1990: Márta Visnyei
1991: Heléna Barócsi
1992: Anikó Javos
1993: Judit Földing-Nagy
1994: Éva Dóczi
1995: Éva Dóczi
1996: Éva Dóczi
1997: Éva Dóczi
1998: Anikó Kálovics
1999: Judit Földing-Nagy
2000: Simona Staicu
2001: Beáta Rakonczai
2002: Simona Staicu
2003: Simona Staicu
2004: Anikó Kálovics
2005: Krisztina Papp
2006: Krisztina Papp

References

Champions 1960–2006
Hungarian Championships. GBR Athletics. Retrieved 2021-04-18.

Winners
 List
Hungarian Championships
Athletics